

Hosts and reporters
 Greg Amsinger: (2009–present) MLB Tonight and MLB Productions' Player Poll
 AJ Andrews: (2022–present) Play Ball 
 Bob Costas: (2009–present) MLB Tonight, Studio 42 with Bob Costas, and MLB Network Showcase
 Ariel Epstein: (2022–present) Pregame Spread
 Robert Flores: (2016–present) MLB Central and MLB Tonight
 Lauren Gardner: (2019–present) Quick Pitch, Hot Stove, and Off Base
 Jamie Hersch: (2016–2019, 2022–present) Quick Pitch
 Brian Kenny: (2012–present)  MLB Tonight and MLB Now MLB network showcase 
 Hannah Keyser: (2022–present) Off Base
 Keiana Martin: (2022–present) Quick Pitch
 Keith McPherson: (2022–present) Off Base
 Kelly Nash: (2015–present) Quick Pitch 
 Melanie Newman: (2022-present) MLB Tonight
 Alanna Rizzo: (2012–2013, 2021–present) MLB Network Countdown, Quick Pitch, Intentional Talk, and High Heat
 Chris Russo: (2014–present) High Heat
 Siera Santos: (2022–present) Quick Pitch and Hot Stove
 Xavier Scruggs: (2022–present) Off Base
 Lauren Shehadi: (2012–present) MLB Central, Hot Stove, Quick Pitch, and MLB Network Countdown
 Matt Vasgersian: (2009–present) Hot Stove, MLB Central, MLB Tonight, MLB Network Showcase, Baseball IQ, and Pregame Spread
 Adnan Virk: (2019–present) MLB Tonight  and High Heat 
 Matt Yallof: (2009–present) MLB Tonight and MLB Network Strike Zone

Analysts
 Yonder Alonso: (2021–present) MLB Tonight
 Ruben Amaro Jr.: (2022–present) MLB Tonight
 Alex Avila: (2022–present) MLB Tonight 
 Sean Casey: (2009–present) MLB Tonight
 Ron Darling: (2013–present) MLB Tonight and Hot Stove 
 Ryan Dempster: (2014–present) MLB Tonight
 Mark DeRosa: (2014–present) MLB Tonight and MLB Central
 Cliff Floyd: (2013–present) MLB Tonight
 John Hart: (2009–2014; 2018–present) 30 Clubs in 30 Days; 30 Teams, 30 Report Cards; MLB Tonight 
 Al Leiter: (2009–present) MLB Tonight
 Mike Lowell: (2011–present) MLB Tonight
 Pedro Martínez: (2015–present) MLB Tonight
 Cameron Maybin: (2022–present) MLB Tonight 
 Kevin Millar: (2010–present) MLB Tonight and Intentional Talk
 Dan O'Dowd: (2015–present) MLB Tonight
 Jake Peavy: (2022–present) MLB Tonight
 Carlos Peña: (2014–present) MLB Tonight
 Hunter Pence: (2022–present) MLB Tonight
 Dan Plesac: (2009–present) MLB Tonight 
 Bo Porter: (2022–present) MLB Tonight 
 Anthony Recker: (2022–present) MLB Tonight
 Harold Reynolds: (2009–present) Hot Stove and MLB Tonight 
 Bill Ripken: (2009–present) MLB Tonight 
 Jim Thome: (2017–present) MLB Tonight 
 Dave Valle: (2009–present) MLB Tonight
 Chris Young: (2021–present) MLB Tonight

Insiders
 Peter Gammons: (2010–present), MLB.com writer, appears on Hot Stove and MLB Tonight
 Jon Heyman: (2009–present), FanRag Sports writer, appears on MLB Tonight
 Jon Morosi: (2016–present), MLB.com writer, appears on Hot Stove, MLB Tonight, and MLB Network Showcase
 Joel Sherman: (2013–present), New York Post senior writer, appears on MLB Tonight
 Jayson Stark: (2018–present) MLB Tonight 
 Tom Verducci: (2009–present), Sports Illustrated senior writer, appears on MLB Tonight and MLB Network Showcase

Former
 Larry Bowa: (2011–2013) Hot Stove and MLB Tonight (now Philadelphia Phillies Senior Adviser to the General Manager)
 Scott Braun: (2012–2022) MLB Tonight, Quick Pitch, MLB Network Strike Zone, and MLB Network Showcase
 Eric Byrnes: (2010–2021) MLB Tonight
 Tony Clark: (2009) MLB Tonight (now executive director of the Major League Baseball Players Association)
 Joey Cora: (2013) MLB Tonight (now New York Mets third base coach)
 Fran Charles: (2014–2022) MLB Tonight, Hot Stove, and MLB Central
 Alexa Datt: (2018–2021) Quick Pitch, The Rundown (now reporter/anchor for Bally Sports Midwest)
 Jamie Erdahl: (2017) Quick Pitch
 Ahmed Fareed: (2011–2012) Hot Stove, MLB Tonight and Quick Pitch (now with NBCSN)
 Kristina Fitzpatrick (2013–2014) MLB Now and High Heat with Christopher "Mad Dog" Russo (now reporter/anchor for CNN and HLN)
 Tim Flannery: (2015–2017) MLB Tonight
 Ron Gant: (2011–2012) MLB Tonight and Hot Stove (now co-host of Good Day Atlanta on WAGA-TV)
 Joe Girardi: (2018–2019) MLB Tonight (now analyst for Marquee Sports Network)
 Darryl Hamilton: (2013–2015) MLB Tonight (deceased) 
 Jim Kaat: (2009–2022) MLB Network Showcase
 Lisa Kerney: (2010–2011) (now with ESPN)
 Trenni Kusnierek: (2009–2010) (now at NBC Sports Boston)
 Barry Larkin: (2009–2011) Hot Stove and MLB Tonight (now analyst for Bally Sports Ohio)
 Hazel Mae: (2009–2011) All Time Games, Hot Stove, MLB Tonight, Quick Pitch and The Rundown (now with Sportsnet)
 Joe Magrane: (2009–2018) MLB Tonight
 Jerry Manuel: (2011–2013) MLB Tonight (now Director of Baseball Operations at William Jessup University in Rocklin, California)
 Stephen Nelson: (2018–2023) MLB Tonight, Intentional Talk, and MLB Network Showcase 
 Leila Rahimi (2014) MLB Network Strike Zone
 Jackie Redmond: (2018) Quick Pitch 
 Victor Rojas: (2009–2010) Hot Stove, MLB Tonight, and Thursday Night Baseball (left to join Los Angeles Angels of Anaheim TV play-by-play; now the GM of the Double-A Frisco Roughriders)
 Chris Rose: (2010–2020) MLB Tonight and Intentional Talk (Now employed by Jomboy Media)
 Ken Rosenthal: (2009–2021), Hot Stove, MLB Tonight, and MLB Network Showcase  (contract not renewed, reportedly due to criticism of MLB Commissioner Rob Manfred)
 Sam Ryan: (2011–2016) MLB Network Showcase, Hot Stove, The Rundown, and Quick Pitch (now sports anchor for WABC-TV)
 Paul Severino: (2011–2018) MLB Tonight, Quick Pitch, and MLB Network Strike Zone (now play by play announcer for Miami Marlins)
 Buck Showalter: (2020–2021) MLB Tonight, and MLB Network Showcase— Now Manager of the New York Mets
 John Smoltz: (2010–2022) MLB Network Showcase and MLB Tonight (fired for refusing to get COVID-19 vaccine)
 Mike Sweeney: (2012) MLB Tonight (now a special assistant for Kansas City Royals)
 Erika Wachter: (2021) Quick Pitch
 Heidi Watney: (2013–2021) Quick Pitch, Hot Stove, and Intentional Talk (now reporter for Apple TV+)
 Mitch Williams: (2009–2014) Hot Stove, MLB Tonight and 30 Clubs in 30 Days (contract terminated) 
 Preston Wilson: (2016–2018)  MLB Tonight

References

External links
Searchable Network TV Broadcasts

MLB Network